Manuel Hermida Losada (27 November 1924 – 17 September 2005), more commonly known as Hermidita, was a Spanish former footballer who used to play for Celta de Vigo in the 1940s.

References

1924 births
2005 deaths
RC Celta de Vigo players
Córdoba CF players
La Liga players
Association football forwards
Spanish footballers